Jujubinus suarezensis is a species of sea snail, a marine gastropod mollusk in the family Trochidae, the top snails.

Subspecies
 † Jujubinus suarezensis fultoni (G. B. Sowerby III, 1890) (synonyms: Calliostoma stenomphalum (G. B. Sowerby III, 1890), Cantharidus fultoni (G. B. Sowerby III, 1890) †, Cantharidus suarezensis fultoni (G. B. Sowerby III, 1890) †, Trochus (Calliostoma) fultoni G. B. Sowerby III, 1890 † (basionym), Trochus fultoni G. B. Sowerby III, 1890 † (original combination), Trochus stenomphalus G. B. Sowerby III, 1890 (junior synonym) )
 Jujubinus suarezensis suarezensis (P. Fischer, 1878) (synonym: Cantharidus suarezensis suarezensis (P. Fischer, 1878) )

Description
The size of the shell varies between 10 mm and 18 mm, the diameter is up to 13 mm. The narrowly perforate shell has a conic-acute shape. The 9 to 10 whorls are planulate. The embryonic whorls are smooth, buff, the remaining whitish-buff. The whorls are ornamented with longitudinal wavy streaks of brown or rosy, and sometimes spiral zones. They are spirally lirate with 7 lirae on the penultimate whorl, upper and lower ones most prominent, the intermediate 5 slightly granose. The interstices are sharply obliquely striate. The body whorl is angular, convex beneath and contains about 8 concentric lirae. The aperture subquadrate. The lip is acute. The columella is subtruncate. The parietal wall bears a callus in adults.

Distribution
This marine species occurs in the following locations:
 Madagascar

References

 Fischer, P., 1878. Diagnoses Trochorum novorum. Journal de Conchyliologie 26: 62-67
Genres Calcar, Trochus, Xenophora, Tectarius et Risella, p. 717 pp, 120 pls
 Dautzenberg, Ph. (1929). Contribution à l'étude de la faune de Madagascar: Mollusca marina testacea. Faune des colonies françaises, III(fasc. 4). Société d'Editions géographiques, maritimes et coloniales: Paris. 321–636, plates IV-VII pp.

External links
 To World Register of Marine Species
 R.N. Kilburn (1975), Pleistocene Molluscs from the West and South Coasts of the Cape Province, South Africa
 

suarezensis
Gastropods described in 1878